The Battle of Hatchie's Bridge, also known as Battle of Davis Bridge or Matamora, was fought on October 5, 1862, in Hardeman County and McNairy County, Tennessee, as the final engagement of the Iuka–Corinth Campaign of the American Civil War. Confederate Major General Earl Van Dorn's army successfully evaded capture by the Union Army, following his defeat at the Battle of Corinth.

Van Dorn's (Confederate) Army of Tennessee retreated from Corinth, Mississippi, on October 4, 1862, but Union Maj. Gen. William S. Rosecrans did not send forces in pursuit until the morning of October 5. Maj. Gen. Edward O.C. Ord, commanding a detachment of Ulysses S. Grant's Army of the Tennessee, was, pursuant to orders, advancing on Corinth to assist Rosecrans. On the night of October 4–5, he camped near Pocahontas. Between 7:30 and 8:00 a.m. the next morning, his force encountered Union Maj. Gen. Stephen A. Hurlbut's 4th Division, District of Jackson, in the Confederates’ front. Ord took command of the now-combined Union forces and pushed Van Dorn's advanced element, Maj. Gen. Sterling Price's Army of the West, back about five miles to the Hatchie River and across Davis's Bridge. After accomplishing this, Ord was wounded in the ankle and Hurlbut assumed command. While Price's men were hotly engaged with Ord's force, Van Dorn's scouts looked for and found another crossing of the Hatchie River. Van Dorn then led his army back to Holly Springs. Grant ordered Rosecrans to abandon the pursuit. Ord had forced Price to retreat, but the Confederates escaped capture or destruction. Although they should have done so, Rosecrans's army had failed to capture or destroy Van Dorn's force.

Order of battle
Union
District of Jackson – Major General Edward O. C. Ord (w)

Confederate
Army of the West – Major General Earl Van Dorn

Price's Corps – Major General Sterling Price

Battlefield

The battlefield site, known as Davis Bridge Battlefield, was listed on the National Register of Historic Places in 1998. A  area of the battlefield is part of the Siege and Battle of Corinth Sites, which was designated a National Historic Landmark in 1991. The Civil War Trust (a division of the American Battlefield Trust) and its partners have acquired and preserved  of the battlefield.

References

Hatchie's Bridge
Hatchie Bridge
Hatchie's Bridge
Hardeman County, Tennessee
McNairy County, Tennessee
Hatchie's Bridge
October 1862 events
American Civil War orders of battle